Angus Thurgate (born 8 February 2000) is an Australian professional footballer who plays as a midfielder for Newcastle Jets FC.

Club career

Newcastle Jets

2017–18
After playing for the Newcastle Jets FC Reserves since 2016 Thurgate was called up to the first team in January 2018 in their round 14 away match against Sydney FC, Thurgate was an unused substitute as the match finished 2–2. He than made his professional debut 2 rounds later at home against Brisbane Roar coming on as an 88th-minute substitute for striker Andrew Nabbout.

2018–19 
In the 2018–19 A-League, Thurgate scored 1 goal out of his 9 appearances. His goal came against Western Sydney Wanderers on 4 June 2019.

2019–20 
In November 2019, Thurgate scored in two consecutive matches against Western United and Wanderers respectively.

References

External links

2000 births
Living people
Australian soccer players
Association football midfielders
Newcastle Jets FC players
A-League Men players
National Premier Leagues players
People from the Mid North Coast
Sportsmen from New South Wales
Soccer players from New South Wales